"Little Girl Blue" is a popular song with music by Richard Rodgers and lyrics by Lorenz Hart, published in 1935.  The song was introduced by Gloria Grafton in the Broadway musical Jumbo.

Film appearances
1962 Billy Rose's Jumbo - sung by Doris Day
1990 The Handmaid's Tale

Recordings
Many popular and jazz artists have recorded the tune, including:
  
The Afghan Whigs
Louis Armstrong
Chet Baker
Polly Bergen - Little Girl Blue (1955)
Donald Byrd - Byrd in Flight (Blue Note 1960)
Ann Hampton Callaway - To Ella with Love (1996)
The Carpenters - Lovelines (1989)
Rosemary Clooney - Rosemary Clooney Sings Rodgers, Hart & Hammerstein (1990)
Sam Cooke - My Kind of Blues (1961)
Doris Day - Billy Rose's Jumbo (1962)
Ethel Ennis - Eyes for You (1964)
Ella Fitzgerald - Ella Fitzgerald Sings the Rodgers & Hart Songbook (1956)
The Four Freshmen - Love Lost (2004)
Judy Garland - Alone (1957)
Red Garland - A Garland of Red (Prestige 1956)
Grant Green - Oleo with Sonny Clark
Eddie Harris - Exodus to Jazz
Johnny Hartman - And I Thought About You (1959)
Coleman Hawkins - Body and Soul (1956)
The Hi-Lo's
Milt Jackson - Reverence and Compassion (1993)
Harry James
Joni James
Keith Jarrett - Standards in Norway
Janis Joplin - I Got Dem Ol' Kozmic Blues Again Mama! (1969, although the lyrics on this version were rearranged)
Morgana King
Diana Krall - From This Moment On (2006)
Stacey Kent - Dreamsville (2001)
Brenda Lee - Reflections in Blue (1964)
John Lewis - The John Lewis Piano (1957)
Hank Mobley - Mobley's Message (Prestige 1956)
Gerry Mulligan with Jon Eardley - California Concerts (1954) 
Laura Mvula - Music from and Inspired by 12 Years a Slave (2013)
Anita O'Day - Anita O'Day and Billy May Swing Rodgers and Hart (1960)
Oscar Peterson - My Favorite Instrument (solo piano)
The Postal Service (a remix of the Nina Simone version)
Sue Raney - Sue Raney, Volume II (2004)
Linda Ronstadt - For Sentimental Reasons (1986)
Diana Ross - Touch Me in the Morning (1973)
Mathilde Santing
Carly Simon - My Romance (1990)
Nina Simone (whose 1958 debut album Little Girl Blue was named after the song)
Frank Sinatra - Songs for Young Lovers (1954)
Sarah Vaughan - Sarah Vaughan Sings Broadway: Great Songs from Hit Shows (1958)
Margaret Whiting - this charted briefly in 1947
Nancy Wilson - Hello Young Lovers'' (1962)

References

Songs from Rodgers and Hart musicals
Songs with music by Richard Rodgers
Songs with lyrics by Lorenz Hart
1935 songs